Oumar Bagayoko (born September 19, 1975) is a retired Malian footballer.

Career
Bagayoko played for Djoliba AC and briefly in Austria Wien. He later played in Kuwait before starting a career in Greece. Here he played for Athinaikos F.C. in the Greek Beta Ethniki, later for Thrasyvoulos F.C. and Chalkida-Lilas F.C. in the Greek Gamma Ethniki.

Bagayoko made several appearances for the Mali national football team, including a 2000 African Nations Cup qualifier and a 2002 FIFA World Cup qualifier against Libya.

References

1975 births
Living people
Malian footballers
Mali international footballers
Association football forwards
Djoliba AC players
FK Austria Wien players
Athinaikos F.C. players
Thrasyvoulos F.C. players
Malian Première Division players
Austrian Football Bundesliga players
Kuwait Premier League players
Football League (Greece) players
Gamma Ethniki players
Malian expatriate footballers
Expatriate footballers in Austria
Malian expatriate sportspeople in Austria
Expatriate footballers in Kuwait
Malian expatriate sportspeople in Kuwait
Expatriate footballers in Greece
Malian expatriate sportspeople in Greece
Khaitan SC players
21st-century Malian people